The 1990 North Rhine-Westphalia state election was held on 13 May 1990 to elect the 11th Landtag of North Rhine-Westphalia. The outgoing government was a majority of the Social Democratic Party (SPD), led by Minister-President Johannes Rau.

The SPD successfully retained their parliamentary majority with minor losses, taking slightly under 50% of the vote. The opposition Christian Democratic Union (CDU) failed to recover from their 1985 losses, recording 36.7%; the Free Democratic Party (FDP) likewise remained essentially level on 6% and 14 seats. The Greens narrowly passed the 5% electoral threshold and entered the Landtag for the first time with 12 seats. The margin of the SPD's victory saw them win 121 of the 151 single-member constituencies, resulting in overhang and leveling seats boosting the Landtag to 237 members. In February 1992, it gained two more due to an election review which reversed the result in the Märkischer Kreis IV constituency, resulting in an additional overhang seat for the SPD and a new leveling seat for the CDU.

Electoral system
The Landtag was elected via mixed-member proportional representation. 151 members were elected in single-member constituencies via first-past-the-post voting, and fifty then allocated using compensatory proportional representation. A single ballot was used for both. The minimum size of the Landtag was 201 members, but if overhang seats were present, proportional leveling seats were added to ensure proportionality. An electoral threshold of 5% of valid votes is applied to the Landtag; parties that fall below this threshold are ineligible to receive seats.

Background

In the previous election held on 12 May 1985, the SPD won a landslide victory, expanding their majority in the Landtag with 52.1% of votes while the CDU fell to 36.5% – a record high and low, respectively. The FDP returned to the Landtag with 6% and took 14 seats. Due to the magnitude of the SPD's victory, they took 125 of the 151 constituencies, necessitating the addition of leveling seats which boosted the Landtag to 227 members. The SPD again formed government alone and Johannes Rau continued as Minister-President.

Parties
The table below lists parties represented in the 10th Landtag of North Rhine-Westphalia.

Results

External links

References

Elections in North Rhine-Westphalia